Sør-Tustna Chapel is a chapel of the Church of Norway in Aure Municipality in Møre og Romsdal county, Norway. It is located in the village of Tømmervåg, on the western coast of the island of Tustna. It is an annex chapel in the Tustna parish which is part of the Ytre Nordmøre prosti (deanery) in the Diocese of Møre. This small wooden chapel was built in a long church design in 1907. It has a seating capacity of about 75 people.

History
The small building was first constructed in 1907 as a prayer house for the people of Tømmervåg on the island of Tustna. In 1952, the prayer house was consecrated as an annex chapel for the Tustna parish. The altarpiece was made by Martin Halsby. The pulpit and baptismal font were both added to the building in 1952. There is no cemetery at this chapel.

See also
List of churches in Møre

References

Aure, Norway
Churches in Møre og Romsdal
Long churches in Norway
Wooden churches in Norway
20th-century Church of Norway church buildings
Churches completed in 1907
1907 establishments in Norway